Chidozie Collins Awaziem (born 1 January 1997) is a Nigerian professional footballer who plays as a central defender for Croatian club Hajduk Split on loan from Boavista.

Club career

Porto
Born in Enugu, Awaziem joined FC Porto from Portugal in 2014, where he spent his last year as a junior and won the corresponding league title. His senior debut was made with the B team in the Segunda Liga.

On 27 January 2016, aged 19, Awaziem appeared in his first competitive game with the main squad, featuring the full 90 minutes in a 2–0 away loss against C.D. Feirense in the Taça da Liga. His maiden appearance in the Primeira Liga took place on 12 February, as he again started in a 2–1 win at S.L. Benfica due to an injury crisis to the defensive sector.

Awaziem was loaned to French club FC Nantes for the 2017–18 season. His first match in Ligue 1 took place on 6 August 2017, when he came on as a 74th-minute substitute in a 3–0 defeat away to Lille OSC.

In January 2019, Awaziem joined Çaykur Rizespor on loan until the end of the campaign. On 15 August, in the same situation, he moved to CD Leganés.

Boavista
Still owned by Porto, Awaziem signed a temporary deal with Boavista F.C. – also in Portugal and the city of Porto – ahead of 2020–21, with the obligation of a permanent four-year contract on 30 June 2021. He returned to the Turkish Süper Lig on 8 September 2021, being loaned to Alanyaspor. 

On 1 August 2022, Awaziem was loaned to HNK Hajduk Split with an option to make the move permanent at the end of the season.

International career
Aged 19, Awaziem was called up by Nigeria for friendlies against Mali and Luxembourg, on 27 and 31 May 2016. He made his senior debut on 1 June 2017, starting in a 3–0 win over Togo in Paris in another exhibition game.

Awaziem was included in Gernot Rohr's 23-man squad for the 2018 FIFA World Cup in Russia, being an unused player as the tournament ended in group stage exit. He was also picked for the 2019 and 2021 Africa Cup of Nations.

Career statistics

International

International goals
 (Nigeria score listed first, score column indicates score after each Awaziem goal)

Honours
Porto
Supertaça Cândido de Oliveira: 2018

References

External links

1997 births
Living people
Nigerian footballers
Footballers from Enugu
Association football defenders
El-Kanemi Warriors F.C. players
Primeira Liga players
Liga Portugal 2 players
FC Porto B players
FC Porto players
Boavista F.C. players
Ligue 1 players
FC Nantes players
Süper Lig players
Çaykur Rizespor footballers
Alanyaspor footballers
La Liga players
CD Leganés players
Croatian Football League players
HNK Hajduk Split players
Nigeria international footballers
2018 FIFA World Cup players
2019 Africa Cup of Nations players
2021 Africa Cup of Nations players
Nigerian expatriate footballers
Expatriate footballers in Portugal
Expatriate footballers in France
Expatriate footballers in Turkey
Expatriate footballers in Spain
Expatriate footballers in Croatia
Nigerian expatriate sportspeople in Portugal
Nigerian expatriate sportspeople in France
Nigerian expatriate sportspeople in Turkey
Nigerian expatriate sportspeople in Spain
Nigerian expatriate sportspeople in Croatia